The Public Health Institute (PHI) is a training and research institute run by the Federal Ministry of Health of Sudan.
Training programs are Master of Family Medicine, Master of Public Health In-service Program, Master in disaster management and Master of Public Health.
The institute has 25 full-time employees and over 50 part-time employees and associates.
It is a member of the International Association of National Public Health Institutes.

References

Universities and colleges in Sudan
Educational institutions established in 2009
2009 establishments in Sudan